Christiane Gagnon (born April 16, 1948) is a Canadian politician who served as the Member of Parliament (MP) for the electoral district of Québec from 1993 to 2011. She is a member of the Bloc Québécois (BQ).

Early life
Gagnon was born in Chicoutimi, Quebec. She worked as a real estate agent.

Tenure in Parliament
She was first elected to the House of Commons in the 1993 federal election as the Bloc Québécois candidate in the district of Québec. She was re-elected in the federal general elections of 1997, 2000, 2004, 2006 and 2008. She was defeated in the 2011 election by NDP candidate Annick Papillon.

She served as the Bloc's caucus chair from 1996 to 1998. She has also been the Bloc's critic of the Status of Women, the Federal Office of Regional Development-Quebec, Housing, Poverty, Canadian Heritage, the National Capital Commission, and the National Capital Region. She did not participate in the 2015 election. She was a candidate in the 2019 election, which she narrowly lost to the Liberal Party incumbent Jean-Yves Duclos.

Electoral record

References

External links

1948 births
Bloc Québécois MPs
Women members of the House of Commons of Canada
French Quebecers
Living people
Members of the House of Commons of Canada from Quebec
Politicians from Saguenay, Quebec
Politicians from Quebec City
Women in Quebec politics
21st-century Canadian politicians
21st-century Canadian women politicians